The 21st International Indian Film Academy Awards were supposed to take place in Indore from 27 to 29 March 2020. Due to the COVID-19 pandemic, they were postponed. However, on 24 November 2021, the IIFA organising team declared the name of winners of all categories through their Instagram handle.  

The following is a list of nominees, technical award winners and popular award winners.

Gully Boy led the ceremony with 17 nominations, followed by Article 15 and Kabir Singh with 8 nominations each, and Uri: The Surgical Strike and War with 6 nominations each.

Gully Boy won 6 awards, including Best Actress (for Alia Bhatt) and Best Supporting Actor (for Siddhant Chaturvedi), thus becoming the most-awarded film at the ceremony.

Winners and nominees

Awards

Music Awards

Technical Awards

Superlatives

References

International Indian Film Academy Awards
IIFA Awards, 2020
IIFA awards